A vergobret was a magistrate in ancient Gaul who held the highest office in many Gallic cities, especially among the Aedui. Julius Caesar discusses the role of the vergobret several times in his Commentaries on the Gallic War, referring to the office with the terms princeps civitatis, principatus, and magistratus.

Elected every year under the aegis of the druids, the vergobret had the right of life and death, and that of commanding the army in defensive action. According to Caesar, he was however forbidden from leaving the borders of the territory of his people ("The laws of the Aedui forbid those who held the highest office from crossing the borders"). This made it necessary to name a general and prevented the vergobret from seizing power beyond this magistrature.

The vergobret was chosen from among the most powerful people. Some tribes, such as the Aedui or Remi, minted coins with the portrait of their vergobrets (the Aedui Dumnorix for instance).

One of the rare archaeological traces of the vergobret came from the 1978 excavations of Dr. Allain in the zone of the temples to Argentomagus (Saint-Marcel, Indre). An olla of terra nigra was found there; it bears the inscription "vercobretos readdas". Briefly mentioned in Gallia in 1980 (Gallia 38-2, p. 327), the inscription later led to publication, including a photo and transcription, in the Revue Archéologique du Centre de la France (RACF). The vase can be seen in the museum of Argentomagus. The meaning of the inscription is along the lines of "the vergobret has sacrificed/consecrated/given" (cf. P-Y Lambert 2003 and X. Delamarre 2003).

Several names of vergobrets are currently known: Liscus in 58 BC, Valetiacos in 53 BC, Convictolitavis of the Aedui in 52 BC, and Celtillos of the Arverni.

For the Lemovices, two names are probable: Sedullos, killed at Alesia, was called dux et princeps lemovicum, "military and civil leader", which probably corresponds to the title of vergobret. Furthermore, an inscription in rock in the Gallo-Roman city of Augustoritum has been found, which is a sign of a yet incomplete Romanization: it cites a certain "Postumus, vergobret, son of Dumnorix" (the latter having no relation to the Aedui of the same name).

References

Pre-Roman Gaul
Aedui
Magistrates